Teleportation is the theoretical transfer of matter and/or energy from one point to another without traversing the physical space between them. It is a common subject in science fiction and fantasy literature, film, video games, and television. In some situations, teleporting is presented as time traveling across space.
 
The use of matter transmitters in science fiction originated at least as early as the 19th century. An early example of scientific teleportation (as opposed to magical or spiritual teleportation) is found in the 1897 novel To Venus in Five Seconds by Fred T. Jane. Jane's protagonist is transported from a strange-machinery-containing gazebo on Earth to planet Venus.

A common fictional device for teleportation is a "wormhole". In video games, the instant teleportation of a player character may be referred to as a warp.

List of fiction containing teleportation

Teleportation illusions in live performance
Teleportation illusions have featured in live performances throughout history, often under the fiction of miracles, psychic phenomenon, or magic.  The cups and balls trick has been performed since 3 BC and can involve balls vanishing, reappearing, teleporting and transposing (objects in two locations interchanging places). A common trick of close-up magic is the apparent teleportation of a small object, such as a marked playing card, which can involve sleight-of-hand, misdirection, and pickpocketing. Magic shows were popular entertainments at fairs in the 18th century and moved into permanent theatres in the mid-19th century. Theatres provided greater control of the environment and viewing angles for more elaborate illusions, and teleportation tricks grew in scale and ambition.  To increase audience excitement, the teleportation illusion could be conducted under the theme of a predicament escape. Magic shows achieved widespread success during the Golden Age of Magic in the late 19th and early 20th centuries.

Written fiction

William Shakespeare invoked a concept resembling teleportation in The Tempest (1610–1611).
 Edward Page Mitchell's 1877 story The Man Without a Body details the efforts of a scientist who discovers a method to disassemble a cat's atoms, transmit them over a telegraph wire, and then reassemble them. When he tries this on himself, the telegraph's battery dies after only his head has been transmitted.
 In Alfred Bester's 1956 novel The Stars My Destination, psionic displacement/teleportation has become commonplace. This story is the origin of the term jaunt in the sense of personal teleportation (spelled "jaunte" in the book, from the surname, "Jaunte", of the first person to do so).

Television 
 In the 1970s series The Tomorrow People and its Nickelodean remake, a group of teenagers have the ability of psychic teleportation.
 The Transformers introduced a character named Skywarp who was capable of teleporting from place to place. Transformers also utilize a device called a "Space Bridge" to travel, usually from Cybertron to a planet in another solar system. Some Transformers like the Transformers: Revenge of the Fallen iteration of Jetfire carry onboard Space Bridges.
 In the Kidsongs 1991 video: "Very Silly Songs", the Kidsongs Kids and their silly adult friends, Willy and Jilly, say the magic words "One and a two and a bop bam boom" to teleport themselves from one place of Silly-Dillyville to another.

Films 
 The 1976 film Logan's Run features a teleportation network called "the circuit", which is used to bring people together for casual sex.

Comics 
 The Dan Dare adventures in the Eagle used a "telesender", originally invented by the Treens.  A running joke was that Dan Dare's assistant Digby always arrived upside down.  Its first appearance was in Voyage to Venus, published in 1950.
 The Marvel comic books feature many mutants and other characters with teleportation powers, such as Azazel, Nightcrawler, Magik, Locus, Lila Cheney, Amanda Sefton, Madelyne Pryor, Blink, The Wink, Paragon, Silver Samurai, and Eden Fesi. The character Spot can open holes he can teleport himself or even parts of himself through.

Video games 

Teleportation as a game mechanic is very common across various genres of video games, generally referred to as warps. Player characters in games may sometimes be transported instantly between game areas, for example. Such warp mechanics can be incorporated into the world as science-fiction or fantasy elements, or might function as a timeskip during relatively uninteresting travel time. From a player's perspective, such a timeskip can be experienced as teleportation.

See also
Portable hole

References 

 
Faster-than-light travel
Physics in fiction
Science fiction themes
Fiction about superhuman features or abilities
Speculative fiction lists